The Nikon F-mount is a type of interchangeable lens mount developed by Nikon for its 35mm format single-lens reflex cameras. The F-mount was first introduced on the Nikon F camera in 1959, and features a three-lug bayonet mount with a 44mm throat and a flange to focal plane distance of 46.5mm. The company continues, with the 2020 D6 model, to use variations of the same lens mount specification for its film and digital SLR cameras.

History 
The Nikon F-mount is one of only two SLR lens mounts (the other being the Pentax K-mount) which were not abandoned by their associated manufacturer upon the introduction of autofocus, but rather extended to meet new requirements related to metering, autofocus, and aperture control. The large variety of F-mount compatible lenses makes it the largest system of interchangeable flange-mount photographic lenses in history. Over 400 different Nikkor lenses are compatible with the system. The F-mount is also popular in scientific and industrial applications, most notably machine vision. The F-mount has been in production for over 50 years, the only SLR lens mount with such longevity.

System of lenses 
In addition to Nikon's own range of "Nikkor" lenses, brands of F-mount photographic lenses include Zeiss, Voigtländer, Schneider, Angénieux, Samyang, Sigma, Tokina, Tamron, Hartblei, Kiev-Arsenal, Lensbaby, and Vivitar. F-mount cameras include current models from Nikon, Fujifilm, Sinar, JVC, Kenko and Horseman. Numerous other manufacturers employ the F-mount in non-photographic imaging applications.

Compatibility 
The F-mount has a significant degree of both backward and forward compatibility. Many current autofocus F-mount lenses can be used on the original Nikon F, and the earliest manual-focus F-mount lenses of the 1960s and early 1970s can, with some modification, still be used to their fullest on all professional-class Nikon cameras. Incompatibilities do exist, however, and adventurous F-mount users should consult product documentation in order to avoid problems. For example, many electronic camera bodies cannot meter without a CPU enabled lens; the aperture of G designated lenses cannot be controlled without an electronic camera body; non-AI lenses (manufactured prior to 1977) can cause mechanical damage to later model bodies unless they are modified to meet the AI specification; and AF-P lenses (introduced in 2016) will not focus, even manually, on cameras introduced before roughly 2013. Many manual focus lenses can be converted to allow metering with consumer Nikon bodies by adding a Dandelion chip to the lens.

Image circle 
Most Nikon F-mount lenses cover a minimum of the standard 36×24mm area of 35mm format and the Nikon FX format, while DX designated lenses cover the 24×16mm area of the Nikon DX format, and industrial F-mount lenses have varying coverage. DX lenses may produce vignetting when used on film and FX cameras. However, Nikon lenses designed for film cameras will work on Nikon digital system cameras with the limitations noted above.

Mounting and control rings 
F-mount lenses lock by turning counter-clockwise (when looking at the front of lens) and unlock clockwise. Nearly all F-mount lenses have zoom and focus controls that rotate in the clockwise direction (as viewed from behind the camera) to increase focal length and focus distance respectively. This convention is also used in Pentax K-mount and Sony A-mount lenses but is opposite of the direction normally used by Canon. F-mount lenses also typically have aperture rings that turn clockwise to close. The aperture rings have two sets of f-stop numbers. On cameras equipped with Nikon's Aperture Direct Readout (ADR) system, a small window under the pentaprism reads the smaller scale and displays the selected f-stop in the viewfinder.

Nikkor

Designations
Nikon has introduced many proprietary designations for F-mount Nikkor lenses, reflecting design variations and developments both in lenses and the F-mount itself. There are also "unofficial" designations used by collectors and dealers to differentiate similar lenses.

Pre-autofocus 

 A — Auto Nikkor (also unofficially F, Pre-AI, Non-AI or NAI) — Designation for the first generation of F-mount lenses, introduced in 1959. These were all single-coated, and meter coupling was provided by a prong (known as the Meter Coupling Prong) fixed to the lens's aperture ring. The Photomic T through-the-lens light meter introduced in 1965 worked at full aperture, so the maximum aperture of the lens had to be communicated to the meter via a manual setting on the ASA dial. The Nikkormat FTn and FTn metered finder for the Nikon F introduced semi-automatic aperture indexing which was achieved by mounting the lens with the aperture ring set to 5.6, and then turning the ring to first the minimum and then the maximum apertures. (The need for this step was eliminated by the AI system below.) Early versions are marked "Nippon Kogaku Japan" and have their focal lengths stated in centimetres, but models produced after about 1965 have focal lengths stated in millimetres. The "Nippon Kogaku Japan" engraving was replaced by "Nikon" from 1971 onwards.Mounting a non-AI lens can damage many modern Nikon camera bodies. AI-cameras that still may use non-AI lenses includes the Nikon F2A/F2AS with Photomic A (DP-11) or AS (DP-12) finder, Nikon (Nikkormat) EL2, as well as Nikon FM and FE. In addition, the Nikon Df, a DSLR introduced in late 2013, can use non-AI lenses. The A lenses can be converted to the AI specification; see AI'd below.
 T, Q, P, H, S, O, N, UD, QD, PD — Appears immediately before or after the "Nikkor" name on F-type lenses (see above), designating the number of optical elements in the design. Short for Tres (3), Quattuor (4), Penta (5), Hex (6), Septem (7), Octo (8), Novem (9), UnDecim (11), QuattuorDecim (14) and Penta-Decem (15). The terms Unus (1) and Bini (2) were also apparently designated, but never used. Terms P=Penta, H=Hexa, and PD=Penta-Decem (Greek root) were used (instead of Quinque, Sex, and QuinDecim) to avoid ambiguity with Quattuor, Septem and QuattuorDecim. This designation scheme was dropped with the introduction of "Modern" (K-type) Nikkors in 1974.
 Auto — Designation for F-type lenses indicating an automatic diaphragm (aperture). Not to be confused with automatic exposure or auto focus, the designation fell out of use in the early 1970s and was not carried onto K-type lenses.
 C — Indicates a multicoated F-type lens. Appears with an interpunct after the number of optical elements (in the form "Nikkor-X·C"). This designation was introduced in 1971 and discontinued in 1974 with the introduction of "Modern" (K-type) Nikkors, when multicoating had become standard practice.
 K — "Modern" or "New" Nikkors introduced in 1974. While Pre-AI for compatibility purposes, K-type lenses introduced the new cosmetics that would be used from 1977 onwards for AI-type lenses (see below). The scalloped-metal focus rings were replaced with rubber grip insets, and the use of element number and coating designations was discontinued. The 'K' designation itself is believed to be derived from the Japanese "konnichi-teki", loosely translatable as "modern" or "contemporary".
 AI — Manual focus with "Automatic Maximum-Aperture Indexing," introduced in 1977. The AI standard adds a Meter Coupling Ridge to the aperture ring, which encodes the current aperture setting relative to the maximum, and a Lens Speed Indexing Post on the mounting flange, which encodes the maximum aperture itself. The Ridge and Post couple to the camera's light meter. Lenses designated AI-S, Series E, and AF all include these features of AI. Current professional Nikon camera bodies link with the Meter Coupling Ridge, but the Lens Speed Indexing Post is ignored and the maximum aperture value is set electronically by the operator instead. AI-designated lenses also improved on the original Meter Coupling Prong, adding cutaways which allow more ambient light to fall on the aperture ring, increasing visibility on cameras which optically projected the setting inside the viewfinder.
 AI'd — An unofficial designation for lenses converted partially (Meter Coupling Ridge only) or completely from non-AI to AI. This is accomplished by replacing the aperture ring and the metering prong (using a long-discontinued kit procured from Nikon) or by modifying the original part. Some independent camera repair technicians continue to offer such conversions.
 AI-S — The successor to AI, the AI-S specification added two mechanical enhancements — standardized aperture control, and the Focal Length Indexing Ridge — required for the shutter priority and other auto-aperture exposure modes of the Nikon FA, F-301/N2000, and F-501/N2020 cameras (although the FA will operate correctly in shutter priority and program modes with any AI lens). Later cameras did not require these features, and interoperate with AI and AI-S lenses identically. The term AI-S is now commonly used to refer to manual focus lenses, and Nikon continues to produce eight prime lens models in its AI-S line. All Nikon AF lenses with aperture rings (non-G) also meet the AI-S specification, except for their lack of a Meter Coupling Prong (which can be added). Visually, AI-S lenses can quickly be identified by the smallest aperture setting (usually f/22) being marked in orange,
 Standardized aperture control. AI-S lens apertures move in a standardized fashion in relation to their stop-down levers. The levers of AI and pre-AI lenses were intended only to close the aperture to its manual setting. The advance of aperture control by the camera body itself, by partial actuation of the stop-down lever, meant more precision was required for consistent exposure. This feature is indicated by a Lens Type Signal notch in the lens mount. Note that despite popular misconception, the F4 is NOT capable of engaging P and S auto-exposure modes with non-CPU lenses
 Focal Length Indexing Ridge. AI-S lenses with a focal length of 135mm or longer are indicated by a ridge on the lens mount, used by FA and F-501 to engage high-speed-biased Program Autoexposure.

Electromechanical and data communication 
 AF — The original autofocus designation, indicating focus driven by a motor inside the camera body. All AF lenses have an integrated CPU (microprocessor). Used in the form "AF Nikkor", this should not be confused with the original autofocus lenses for the F3AF camera, which were designated "AF-Nikkor" and are considered predecessors to AF-I lenses.
 AF-N — Indicates the "New" version of an AF lens. The change from plastic focus rings on early AF lenses to the a new "rubber inset focus ring" (RIFR) is often indicated by the AF-N designation. Introduced in 1990.
 AF-I — Autofocus-Internal. Driven by a coreless DC motor. Used only in long telephoto lenses (300 mm 2.8 through 600 mm 4.0). Introduced in 1992.
 AF-D — Designation for an AF lens (as above) with "D" functionality (see "D" below). Introduced in 1992.
 AF-S — Autofocus-Silent. Uses a "Silent Wave Motor" (SWM) (ultrasonic motor) to focus quietly and quickly. Similar to Canon's "USM" technology. Introduced in 1996.
 AF-P — Autofocus using a stepper motor. First F-Mount lens in 2015 after being introduced 2011 in the Nikon 1-mount. All DX AF-P lenses omit the physical AF/MF switch — those with Vibration Reduction (VR) omit the VR-switch.Fully AF-P compatible without any firmware update are the Nikon D850, D500, D7500, D5600, D3400, D3500, Nikon-1 series with FT1 adapter and newer cameras. Fully AF-P compatible after update are the Nikon D5, D5500 and D5300. After update the following cameras lack a software VR-switch: D4S, D4, D810, D810A, D800, D800E, D750, D610, D600, Df, D7200, D7100 and D3300  if the lens includes no physical VR-switch, VR is always on. Additionally they lack "Manual focus ring in AF mode", the manual override of autofocus.The Nikon D3X, D3S, D3, D700, D300, D300S, D7000 and D2XS operate only AF-P FX lenses with additionally restrictions that after a reactivation from the standby mode a (quick) automatic or manual refocusing must take place as the focus is reset to infinity as they wake up. To avoid this, the standby time may be set in the camera for a longer time or "Unlimited". The D5200 works with DX and FX lenses, but additionally displays a "Lens not attached" message if a lens lock switch was activated when the camera is turned on.The AF-P focus motor will not work with all Nikon film cameras and D1 to other D2 series, D200, D100, D5100, D5000, D90, D80, D70 series, D3200, D3100, D3000, D60, D50, D40 and D40X. Standard is VR = on and focus to infinity with all cameras only supporting E-type lenses. Not to be confused with old AI-P "Program" (CPU) lenses.
 CPU — Central Processing Unit. The lens is fitted with electrical contacts for digital communication with the camera. All AF and AI-P lenses are CPU lenses. Some non-professional Nikon cameras require CPU lenses for metered operation. This designation appears in specifications but not lens names.
 D — Distance. Indicated after the f-number in the name, and also occasionally designated AF-D. The integrated CPU electronically communicates focus distance information, which is incorporated into the camera's exposure calculations in 3D Matrix Metering mode, and also D-TTL and I-TTL flash autoexposure. All AF-I, AF-S, and G-type lenses are also D-type.
 E — Electromagnetic diaphragm. The aperture diaphragm of an E lens is controlled digitally by the camera, and actuated electromagnetically by a system housed within the lens, rather than employing the F-mount's traditional mechanical diaphragm linkage. This system first appeared in certain Perspective Control lenses, designated PC-E (with designs that preclude a mechanical linkage). E-type lenses aperture control is only supported by all DSLRs with CMOS image sensor except the Nikon D90. For all other cameras the lens aperture stays maximum open with normal autofocus and metering. E Lenses with manual aperture control like PC-E lenses allow manual diaphragm operation on all cameras, with possible unreliable metering on DSLRs without E-type support. Otherwise E lenses are similar to G lenses. Not to be confused with old AI Series E lenses.
 G — Designation for lenses without an aperture ring, indicated after the f-number in the name. G lenses retain the mechanical diaphragm coupling of other Nikkors, but the aperture setting can only be controlled by the camera body. Only autofocus bodies with command dials are capable of controlling G lenses. Older autofocus bodies will work with G lenses in shutter priority and program modes with full opened aperture. Some recent G lenses feature a weatherproofing gasket around the mounting flange. G lenses otherwise have the same characteristics as D lenses.
 P or AI-P — "AI with Program." CPU-enabled variation of AI-S. Includes only the 45/2.8P, 500/4P and 1200-1700/5.6-8P Nikkor lenses. Zeiss ZF.2 and Voigtländer SL II lenses are also AI-P designs, although they are not designated as such. Not to be confused with early lenses marked "Nikkor-P" meaning a 5-element lens (see pre-autofocus designations above).

Optical design 
 Aspherical — Aspheric lens elements. Also Hybrid used: Thin molded aspheric elements coupled to a conventional glass element. This designation appears in specifications but not lens names.
 CRC — Close Range Correction. Improved performance at close focus distances. Achieved by internal focus movements that move differently relative to the movement of the other focusing elements. This designation appears in specifications but not lens names.
 DC — Defocus Control. DC lenses have a separate control ring for spherical aberration, which affects primarily the appearance of out-of-focus areas, also known as bokeh. At extreme settings, DC lenses can generate an overall soft-focus effect. Includes only the AF DC-Nikkor 105mm 2D and AF DC-Nikkor 135mm 2D.
 ED — "Extra-low Dispersion" glass incorporated to reduce chromatic aberration. Lenses using ED elements usually carry a gold ring around the barrel to indicate the fact (although on some low-end lenses gold foil is used instead), and older lenses were also marked "NIKKOR✻ED". In addition to normal ED glass, "Super ED" glass is used in some lenses.
 FL — Fluorite. Designates a lens which includes one or more elements constructed of fluorite instead of glass. Currently includes the AF-S 800mm f/5.6E FL ED VR, available since 2013, the AF-S 400mm f/2.8E FL ED VR, available since 2014, the AF-S 500mm f/4E FL ED VR and AF-S 600mm f/4E FL ED VR, available since 2015, and the AF-S 70-200mm f/2.8E FL ED VR, available since 2016.
 GN — Guide Number. Assists in flash exposure on cameras without automatic flash metering. The flash's guide number is set on the lens, and the aperture is accordingly coupled to the lens's focus ring for correct exposure. The only GN lens, the supercompact GN Auto Nikkor (it was the second smallest Nikon F-mount lens ever made), was built during the late 1960s and early 1970s. An updated variant with a lens hood was made through the 1990's alongside the FM3a.
 HRI —  High refractive index elements. Contains elements with a refractive index >2. This designation appears in specifications but not lens names.
 IF — Internal Focus. Focusing is accomplished through the movement of internal lens groups, eliminating extension and rotation of the front lens element, allowing focus to be driven quickly by a small motor. IF lenses also allow the use of a polarizing filter without the need to readjust it after focus.
 Micro — Micro-Nikkor lenses are capable of high reproduction ratios, typically 1:2 or 1:1, for macro photography. Industrial Nikkor lenses designed for greater than 1:1 reproduction are, in contrast, labeled Macro-Nikkor. The first Micro-Nikkor lenses were created for producing microforms of Kanji text.
 N — Indicates the Nano Crystal Coat, a relatively new type of lens coating that originated in Nikon's semiconductor division. Lenses with this coating feature the logo of an "N" inside an elongated hexagon on the name plate.
 NIC — Nikon Integrated Coating, a proprietary multicoating. Appears in specifications but not lens names.
 PC — Perspective Control. Lens features shift movements (and also tilt movements on some models) to control perspective and depth-of-field. Newer PC lenses are designated PC-E (see designation E above). Not to be confused with early lenses marked "Nikkor-P·C" meaning a five-element coated lens (see pre-autofocus designations above).
 PF — Phase Fresnel.  To counteract chromatic aberration.  It replaces several lens elements, thus reducing the size and weight of a lens.
 Reflex — Designates a catadioptric (mirror) lens.
 RF — Rear Focusing. Quite similar to internal focusing. Focusing is accomplished through the movement of rear lens groups, eliminating extension and rotation of the front lens element, allowing focus to be driven quickly by a small motor. RF lenses also allow the use of a polarizing filter without the need to readjust it after focus.
 SIC — Super Integrated Coating, a proprietary multicoating. Appears in specifications but not lens names.
 UV — Lenses designed for imaging ultraviolet light.
 VR — Vibration Reduction. Uses a moving optical group to reduce the photographic effects of camera shake. Some VR lenses also support a panning mode, detecting horizontal movement of the lens and minimizing only vertical vibration. The second generation of VR is called VR II, which is designed to offer another 1-stop advantage over original VR, but lenses with this feature are still designated simply "VR."

Alternate product lines 
 DX — Lens designed for the smaller Nikon DX format. Vignetting may occur if used on a 35mm format or Nikon FX format camera in full-frame mode, although some DX lenses cover the full 135 frame at longer focal lengths.
 IX — Lenses designed for use with the now-defunct Pronea APS SLR. These are all autofocus zoom lenses. They are not compatible with cameras outside of the Pronea system unless mirror lock-up is used
 Series E — A line of eight lower-cost lenses manufactured during the 1980s for Nikon's amateur SLRs. They sacrificed some construction quality and employed simpler but often surprisingly good optical designs. Early Series E lenses were built to the AI specification. Later Series E lenses were upgraded to the AI-S specification, and are identifiable by a metal ring on the barrel. None of this family of lenses were branded Nikkor, instead carrying the text "Nikon Lens Series E." Not to be confused with E - type autofocus and electromagnetic diaphragm lenses.

Esoteric 
 Bellows — Lens designed exclusively for use on a bellows unit, primarily for macro photography. Also called short mount. Since some Nikon bellows allow for a front rise, they allow a limited variety of lenses to be used similarly to a PC lens (see Optical design above).
 Fisheye-Nikkor — Lenses producing either a circular image on the film plane/imager or a partially circular image.  Can be as wide as 220° or typically 180°.  Fisheye lenses are based upon an equidistant projection formula, or an orthographic projection (OP).
 LW  — Amphibian lens.  Produced for Nikonos system, featuring a Nikonos lens mount, waterproof, but not designed for underwater use.  Ideal for surfers, speleologists.
 Medical — Nikkor designation for a macro lens with a built-in ring light strobe system, designed for clinical and scientific applications.
 Noct — "Night." Specialty low-light lens designed for maximum sharpness at the widest aperture setting. The name has been applied to the Noct-Nikkor 58mm 1.2 and the Nikkor Z 58mm 0.95 S Noct.
 OP — Orthographic Projection. A fisheye lens that produces an orthographic rather than the equidistant image used on other fisheye lenses. This is useful for measuring the amount of sky blocked by a building or object. This maintains the same brightness in the image as in the object, with no falloff at the edges.
 UW — Underwater lenses. Produced for the Nikonos systems.

Manual-focus lenses

Manual-focus prime lenses

 6mm 2.8 Circular Fisheye (220°)
 6mm 5.6 Circular Fisheye (220°) (requires MLU)
 7.5mm 5.6 Circular Fisheye (requires MLU)
 8mm 2.8 Circular Fisheye
 8mm 8.0 Circular Fisheye (requires MLU)
 10mm 5.6 OP Circular Fisheye (requires MLU)
 13mm 5.6
 15mm 3.5
 15mm 5.6
 16mm 2.8 Full Frame Fisheye (180°)
 16mm 3.5 Full Frame Fisheye (170°)
 18mm 4.0
 18mm 3.5

 20mm 1.8
 20mm 2.8
 20mm 3.5 UD
 20mm 3.5
 20mm 4.0
 21mm 4.0 (requires MLU)
 24mm 2.0
 24mm 2.8
 28mm 2.0
 28mm 2.8
 28mm 3.5

 35mm 1.4
 35mm 2.0
 35mm 2.8
 45mm 2.8 GN
 45mm 2.8 P
 50mm 1.2
 50mm 1.4
 50mm 1.8
 50mm 2.0
 55mm 1.2

 58mm 1.2 Noct
 58mm 1.4
 85mm 1.4
 85mm 1.8
 85mm 2.0
 105mm 1.8
 105mm 2.5
 105mm 4.0 (pre-set)
 120mm 4.0 IF Medical

 135mm 2.0
 135mm 2.8
 135mm 3.5

 180mm 2.8 ED
 200mm 2.0 ED-IF
 200mm 4.0 Q
 200mm 4.0

 200mm 5.6 Medical
 300mm 2.0 ED-IF
 300mm 2.8 ED (pre-set)
 300mm 2.8 ED-IF
 300mm 4.5 P
 300mm 4.5 H
 300mm 4.5 ED
 300mm 4.5 ED-IF
 400mm 2.8 ED-IF
 400mm 3.5 ED-IF
 400mm 4.5 (lens head; requires CU-1 or AU-1 focus unit)
 400mm 5.6 ED
 400mm 5.6 ED-IF
 500mm 4.0 P ED-IF
 500mm 5.0 Reflex
 500mm 8.0 Reflex
 600mm 4.0 ED-IF
 600mm 5.6 (lens head; requires CU-1 or AU-1 focus unit)
 600mm 5.6 ED (lens head; requires CU-1 or AU-1 focus unit)
 600mm 5.6 ED-IF
 800mm 5.6 ED-IF
 800mm 8.0 (lens head; requires CU-1 or AU-1 focus unit)
 800mm 8.0 ED (lens head; requires CU-1 or AU-1 focus unit)
 800mm 8.0 ED-IF
 1000mm 6.3 Reflex
 1000mm 11.0 Reflex
 1200mm 11.0 (lens head; requires CU-1 or AU-1 focus unit)
 1200mm 11.0 ED (lens head; requires CU-1 or AU-1 focus unit)
 1200mm 11.0 ED-IF
 2000mm 11.0 Reflex

Micro 
 45mm 2.8 ED PC-E Micro
 55mm 2.8 Micro
 55mm 3.5 Micro
 55mm 4.0 UV Micro (prototype only)

 85mm 2.8D PC Micro
 85mm 2.8D PC-E Micro
 105mm 4.5 UV Micro
 105mm 4.0 (bellows lens)
 105mm 4.0 Micro
 105mm 2.8 Micro
 135mm 4.0 (bellows lens)
 200mm 4.0 IF Micro

Manual-focus zoom lenses 
 25–50mm 4.0
 28–45mm 4.5
 28–50mm 3.5 Macro
 28–85mm 3.5-4.5 Macro
 35–70mm 3.5
 35–70mm 3.5 Macro
 35–70mm 3.3-4.5
 35–70mm 3.5-4.8
 35–85mm 2.8-4.0 (prototype only)

 35–105mm 3.5-4.5 Macro
 35–135mm 3.5-4.5
 35–200mm 3.5-4.5 Macro
 43–86mm 3.5
 50–135mm 3.5 Macro
 50–300mm 4.5
 50–300mm 4.5 ED
 70–210 mm 4.5-5.6

 80–200 mm 2.8 ED
 80–200 mm 4.0
 80–200 mm 4.5
 85–250mm 4.0-4.5
 100–300mm 5.6 Macro
 180–600mm 8.0 ED
 200–400mm 4.0 ED
 200–600mm 9.5
 360–1200mm 11.0 ED
 1200–1700mm 5.6-8.0 P ED-IF

Series E lenses

 28mm 2.8
 35mm 2.5
 50mm 1.8
 100mm 2.8
 135mm 2.8
 36–72mm 3.5
 70–210 mm 4.0
 75–150mm 3.5

Perspective control (PC) lenses

Nikon PC lenses, like other perspective control lenses, offer adjustments that duplicate certain view camera movements. The 28mm and 35mm PC lenses support shifting the lens in relation to the film or sensor plane, while Nikon's 19mm, 24mm, 45mm, and 85mm PC-E lenses also support tilting.

Nikon currently offers four different PC lenses for sale: the four PC-E Nikkors (2008 and 2016), and the 85mm PC-Nikkor (1999). The 45mm and 85mm "Micro" lenses offer close focus (0.5 magnification) for macrophotography. The PC-E lenses (the "E" designates an electromagnetic diaphragm) offer automatic aperture control with all DSLRs with CMOS image sensor except the Nikon D90. With earlier DSLRs and all "analog" film camera models, a PC-E lens operates like a PC lens. The PC Micro-Nikkor 85mm 2.8D lens offers only preset aperture control, actuated mechanically by pressing a plunger.

History
In July 1962, Nikon released the first interchangeable perspective-control lens available for a single-lens reflex camera, the 35mm 3.5 PC-Nikkor. This was followed in 1968 by a redesigned 35mm 2.8 PC-Nikkor in which the shifting portion of the lens was further from the camera's body, in order to clear the new "Photomic" meters. The last optical redesign of this 35mm lens was released in 1980.

The 35mm PC-Nikkor did not meet the need of photographers for a wider-angle lens, so in July 1975 Nikon released the 28mm 4 PC-Nikkor. In February 1981 Nikon released an improved version of this lens, the 28mm 3.5 PC-Nikkor, with a new optical design.  This was the last of the completely manual PC-Nikkors to be offered.

Specifications

Notes

Automatic focus lenses

AF prime lenses

FX format primes
 14mm 2.8D ED AF
 16mm 2.8D AF Full Frame Fisheye
 18mm 2.8D AF
 20mm 1.8G ED AF-S N
 20mm 2.8 AF
 20mm 2.8D AF
 24mm 1.4G ED AF-S N
 24mm 1.8G ED AF-S N
 24mm 2.8 AF
 24mm 2.8D AF
 28mm 1.4D AF Aspherical
 28mm 1.4E ED N
 28mm 1.8G AF-S N
 28mm 2.8 AF
 28mm 2.8D AF

 35mm 1.4G AF-S N
 35mm  1.8G ED AF-S
 35mm 2.0 AF
 35mm 2.0D AF
 50mm 1.4 AF
 50mm 1.4D AF
 50mm 1.8 AF
 50 mm 1.8D AF
 50mm 1.4G AF-S
 50mm 1.8G AF-S
 58mm 1.4G AF-S N 
 80mm 2.8 AF (F3AF dedicated)
 85mm 1.4D AF
 85mm 1.4G AF-S N
 85mm 1.8 AF
 85mm 1.8D AF
 85mm 1.8G AF-S
 105mm 1.4E AF-S ED
 105mm 2.0D AF DC
 135mm 2.0 AF DC
 135mm 2.0D AF DC
 180mm 2.8 ED-IF AF
 180mm 2.8D ED-IF AF
 200mm 3.5 ED-IF AF (F3AF dedicated)
 300mm 4 ED-IF AF
 300mm 4D ED-IF AF-S
 300mm 2.8 ED-IF AF
 300mm 2.8D ED-IF AF-I
 300mm 2.8D ED-IF AF-S
 300mm 2.8D ED-IF AF-S II
 400mm 2.8D ED-IF AF-I
 400mm 2.8D ED-IF AF-S
 400mm 2.8D ED-IF AF-S II
 500mm 4D ED-IF AF-I
 500mm 4D ED-IF AF-S
 500mm 4D ED-IF AF-S II
 600mm 4D ED-IF AF-I
 600mm 4D ED-IF AF-S
 600mm 4D ED-IF AF-S II
55mm 2.8 AF Micro
 60mm 2.8 AF Micro
 60mm 2.8D AF Micro
 60mm 2.8D AF-S G Micro N
 105mm 2.8D AF Micro
 200mm 4D ED-IF AF Micro
105 mm 2.8G ED-IF AF-S VR Micro N

 200mm 2G ED-IF AF-S VR
 200mm 2G ED-IF AF-S VR II N
 200–400mm 4G ED-IF AF-S VR
 200–400mm 4G ED-IF AF-S VR II N
 300mm 4E PF ED-IF AF-S VR N
 300mm 2.8G ED-IF AF-S VR
 300mm 2.8G ED-IF AF-S VR II N
 400mm 2.8G ED-IF AF-S VR N
 400mm 2.8E FL ED-IF AF-S VR N
 500mm 4G ED-IF AF-S VR N
 500mm 4E FL ED-IF AF-S VR N
 600mm 4G ED-IF AF-S VR N
 600mm 4E FL ED-IF AF-S VR N
 800mm 5.6E FL ED-IF AF-S VR N

DX format primes 

 10.5 mm 2.8G ED AF DX Fisheye
 35 mm 1.8G AF-S DX

 40mm 2.8G AF-S DX Micro-Nikkor
 85mm Micro-Nikkor 3.5G ED AF-S VR DX

AF zoom lenses

FX format zooms

 14–24mm 2.8G ED AF-S N
 17–35 mm 2.8 ED-IF AF-S
 18–35mm 3.5-4.5D ED-IF AF
 18–35mm 3.5-4.5G ED-IF AF-S
 20–35mm 2.8D IF
 24–50mm 3.3-4.5 AF
 24–50mm 3.3-4.5D AF
 24–70mm 2.8G ED AF-S N
 24–85mm 2.8-4D IF AF
 24–85mm 3.5-4.5G ED-IF AF-S
 24–120mm 3.5-5.6D AF
 28–70mm 2.8D ED-IF AF-S
 28–70mm 3.5-4.5D AF
 28-80 mm 3.5-5.6D AF
 28–80 mm 3.3-5.6G AF
 28–85mm 3.5-4.5 AF
 28–100mm 3.5-5.6G AF
 28–105mm 3.5-4.5D AF
 28–200mm 3.5-5.6D IF AF
 28–200mm 3.5-5.6G ED-IF AF
 35–70mm 2.8 AF
 35–70mm 2.8D AF
 35–70 mm 3.3-4.5 AF
 35–80mm 4-5.6D AF
 35–105mm 3.5-4.5 AF
 35–105mm 3.5-4.5D IF AF
 35–135mm 3.5-4.5 AF
 55–200mm f/4-5.6G IF-ED Lens
 70–210 mm 4 AF
 70–210 mm 4-5.6 AF
 70–210 mm 4-5.6D AF
 70–300 mm 4-5.6D AF
 70–300 mm 4-5.6D ED AF
 70–300 mm 4-5.6G AF
 75–240mm 4.5-5.6D AF
 75–300mm 4.5-5.6 AF
 80–200mm 2.8 ED AF
 80–200mm 2.8D ED AF II
 80–200 mm 2.8D ED AF III
 80–200 mm 2.8D ED AF-S
 80–200mm 4.5-5.6D AF
 70–180mm 4.5-5.6 ED AF-D Micro (the only macro zoom lens for 35mm format)

 16–35mm 4G ED AF-S VR N
 24–70mm 2.8E ED AF-S VR N
 24–85mm 3.5-4.5G ED-IF AF-S VR
 24–120mm 3.5-5.6G AF-S VR
 24–120mm 4G ED AF-S VR
 28–300mm 3.5-5.6G ED AF-S VR
 70–200mm 2.8G ED-IF AF-S VR
 70–200 mm f/2.8G ED-IF AF-S VR II
 70–200 mm f/2.8E FL ED VR
 70–200mm 4G ED AF-S VR
 70–300 mm 4.5-5.6G IF-ED AF-S VR
 80–400mm 4.5-5.6D ED AF VR
 80–400mm 4.5-5.6G ED AF-S VR N
 200–500mm 5.6E AF-S ED VR

DX format zooms

 10–20 mm f/4.5–5.6G AF-P VR DX
 10–24mm 3.5-4.5 ED AF-S DX
 12–24 mm 4G ED-IF AF-S DX
 16–85 mm 3.5-5.6G ED-IF AF-S DX
 17–55mm 2.8G ED-IF AF-S DX
 18–55 mm 3.5-5.6G ED AF-S DX
 18–55 mm 3.5-5.6G ED AF-S II DX
 18–70 mm 3.5-4.5G ED-IF AF-S DX
 18–135mm 3.5-5.6G ED-IF AF-S DX
 55–200 mm 4-5.6G ED AF-S DX
 70-300mm f/4.5-6.3G ED AF-P DX

 16–80 mm 2.8–4E AF-S VR DX
 16–85mm 3.5-5.6G ED AF-S VR DX
 18–55 mm 3.5-5.6G AF-S VR DX
 18–55mm 3.5-5.6G AF-S VR DX II
 18-105mm 3.5-5.6G ED VR
 18-140mm 3.5-5.6G ED VR
 18–200 mm 3.5-5.6G ED-IF AF-S VR DX
 18–200 mm 3.5-5.6G ED-IF AF-S VR DX II
 18-300 mm 3.5-5.6G ED-IF AF-S VR DX
 18–300mm 3.5-6.3G ED AF-S VR DX
 55–200 mm 4-5.6G ED AF-S VR DX
 55–300mm 4.5-5.6G ED AF-S VR DX
 70-300mm f/4.5-6.3G ED AF-P VR DX

Lenses with integrated autofocus motors

Nikkor lenses designated AF-S, AF-I, or AF-P have integrated autofocus motors, but other manufacturers included in the list do not designate it as clearly. These lenses are needed for autofocus on certain newer low-end Nikon cameras which lack an autofocus motor. These are the Nikon D40, D40X, D60, D3xxx (most recent: D3400), D5xxx (most recent: D5600) and the Nikon 1 series with FT1 adapter.

Teleconverters

 TC-1 (2.0x)
 TC-2 (2.0x)
 TC-200 (2.0x)
 TC-300 (2.0x)
 TC-201 (2.0x)
 TC-301 (2.0x)
 TC-14 (1.4x)
 TC-14A (1.4x)
 TC-14B (1.4x)
 TC-14C (1.4x) (supplied exclusively with Nikkor 300mm f/2 Ai-S IF-ED)
 TC-16 (1.6x) (F3AF only)
 TC-16A (1.6x)
 TC-20E (2.0x)
 TC-14E (1.4x)
 TC-14E II (1.4x)
 TC-14E III (1.4x)
 TC-17E II (1.7x)
 TC-20E II (2.0x)
 TC-20E III (2.0x)
 TC800-1.25E ED (1.25x) (supplied exclusively with Nikkor AF-S 800mm f/5.6 FL ED-IF VR N)

Other brands

Zeiss ZF

Zeiss ZF series lenses are manual-focus designs Nikon AI-S type aperture indexing. They are manufactured by Cosina to Zeiss specifications.

Four design variations are designated ZF, ZF.2, ZF-I, and ZF-IR.

ZF is the original product line. 
ZF.2 lenses are CPU-enabled (similar to Nikon AI-P lenses) offering full metering compatibility with the full range of AF Nikon SLR cameras. 
ZF-I lenses add mechanical locks for focus and aperture, and additional environmental sealing, for industrial applications. 
ZF-IR lenses are adapted to infrared imaging, with coatings that transmit wavelengths up to 1100 nm, and focus scales marked for infrared.

Zeiss CP.2

CP.2 lenses are a series of Zeiss "CompactPrime" cinema lenses which present F-mount as one of three mounting options. The lenses cover the 36×24 mm area of the 35mm format or Nikon FX format, and lenses 28 mm and longer share a common T-stop (T/) of 2.1.

Hartblei

Kenko

Kiev-Arsenal
 MC TS Arsat 35mm 2.8 Tilt Shift
 MC Peleng 8mm 3.5
 MC Peleng 17mm 2,8
 MC Arsat-H 50mm 1,4
 MC ZOOM Arsat-M 80-200mm 4,5
 MC Kalejnar-5H 100mm 2.8 
 APO Arsat-H 300mm 2,8

Voigtländer

Angénieux
 28–70 mm 2.6 AF
 35–70 mm 2.5-3.3
 70–210 mm 3.5
 180 mm 2.3 DEM APO
 200 mm 2.8 DEM ED

Schneider Kreuznach
 PC Super-Angulon 28 mm 2.8
 PC-TS Super-Angulon 50 mm 2.8 HM
 PC-TS Makro-Symmar 90 mm 4.0 HM

Samyang

Sigma

Tamron

Tokina

Compatible cameras

 Nikon "F", "N", and "D" series SLR cameras.
 Nikkormat (Nikomat in Japan) "F" and "EL" series SLR cameras.
 Nikon 1 series with FT1 adapter
 Nikon Z series with FTZ adapter
 Fujifilm SLRs based on Nikon bodies, including:
 FinePix S1 Pro
 FinePix S2 Pro
 FinePix S3 Pro
 FinePix S5 Pro
 Canon M15P-CL Industrial Camera
 Kodak SLRs DCS series based on Nikon bodies, including:
 Kodak DCS-100
 Kodak DCS-200
 Kodak NC2000 / NC2000e
 Kodak DCS 315 / 330
 Kodak DCS-410
 Kodak DCS-420
 Kodak DCS-460
 Kodak DCS 620 / 620x
 Kodak DCS 660 / 660M
 Kodak DCS 720x
 Kodak DCS 760
 Kodak DCS Pro 14n
 Kodak DCS Pro 14nx
 Kodak DCS Pro SLR/n
 Medium-format systems
 Horseman DigiWide camera
 Sinar "m" system (using 35mm Mirror Module)
 OpenReflex
 Video cameras
 edgertronic SC1 high speed video camera
 JVC JY-HMQ30 (4K resolution)
 Red One digital video camera (using Red F-mount)
 Camera-like "adapters"
 Redrock M2
 Letus Extreme
 Shoot35 SGpro
 P+S Technik Mini35
 Movietube
 Kiev Arsenal
 Kiev 17
 Kiev 19
 Kiev 19M
 Kiev 20
 Ricoh Singlex (a.k.a. Sears SLII)

See also
Nikon Z-mount
History of the single-lens reflex camera
Full-frame digital SLR
Nikon S-mount
Nikon 1-mount
List of Nikon F-mount lenses with integrated autofocus motors
Lenses for SLR and DSLR cameras

References

External links

 Nikkor lens acronyms explained
 Nikon Manual Focus Lens Versions
 Nikon F Lens Database
 Nikon Lens Database
 Nikon Lenses Reviewed

Lens mounts
 F-mount
 F-mount